Cheina (English: The Agony) is a 2003 Indian Meitei language film directed by Oken Amakcham and produced by Shanti Thokchom. It stars Gurumayum Kalpana, Lingjelthoibi, Wahengbam Somoraj and Thingom Pritam in the lead roles. The story and screenplay was written by Yumnam Rajendra and produced under the banner of Dashu Films. The film got censor certificate on 30 December 2002 and was released on 18 January 2003 at Usha Cinema, Paona Bazar, Imphal.

Plot
Thabal, a village Pradhan, and his wife Thanil lead a happy life but the longing for a child persists. Their locality sister Tharo has a love affair with Thambousana but her mother is not in favour of their relationship. The former gets married to Thembung, a Brahmin, but Thambousana has no idea about it since he is pursuing his further studies outside the state. He keeps sending letters to Tharo.  She does not want to disclose her current status as she knows Thambousana's nature. When Tharo narrates it to Thanil, the latter decides to bear the burden. She secretly keeps all the letters sent to Tharo. Incidentally, Thabal comes across it and sees Thanil in a very bad light. In a fit of rage, Thabal throttles Thanil. She dies in the moment. When Tharo comes to take the letters, Thabal finally understands the real owner. He is filled with full of regret and remorse. Thabal suffers from depression which also costs his life at the end.

Cast
 Gurumayum Kalpana as Yumnam Thanil Devi
 Lingjelthoibi as Tharo
 Wahengbam Somoraj as Thabal
 Thingom Pritam as Thambousana
 Chandrahas as Thembung
 Longjam Ongbi Lalitabi as Tharo's mother
 Oken Amakcham as Doctor
 Mangangsana as Pena player
 Baby Sanjeeta
 Jagdish
 Gouranityai
 Nenu
 Bimol
 Hemabati
 Karuna
 Bharat

Accolades
The movie won the Best Feature Film award at the 6th Manipur State Film Festival.

Soundtrack
Oken Amakcham composed the soundtrack for the film and Sarat Yumnam, R.K. Lalmani and Y. Swarnalata wrote the lyrics. The songs are titled Leinam Leinam, Punshigi Ahanba, Tanglou Thenglaba and Thabal Pharaba Ahing.

References

Meitei-language films
2003 films